is a train station in Miyazaki City, Miyazaki Prefecture, Japan.

Lines

Layout 
The station, which is unstaffed, consists of a side platform serving a single track at grade in an area of rural farmland. There is no station building, only a simple shelter made from disused rails on the platform.

Adjacent stations

History
The station closed when the Miyazaki Railway ceased operations on 1 July 1962. Subsequently, Japanese National Railways (JNR) extended its then Shibushi Line north from  towards Minami-Miyazaki on the same route and reopened Sosanji as an intermediate station on 8 May 1963. With the privatization of JNR on 1 April 1987, the station came under the control of JR Kyushu.

Passenger statistics
In fiscal 2016, the station was used by an average of 21 passengers (boarding only) per day.

See also
List of railway stations in Japan

References

External links
Sosanji (JR Kyushu)

Railway stations in Japan opened in 1915
Railway stations in Miyazaki Prefecture
Miyazaki (city)